Giorgi Saakadze is a 1942 Soviet drama film directed by Mikheil Chiaureli.

Plot
XVII century. The Georgian state, fragmented into small principalities, is an object of desire to Turkey and Iran. Hordes of Ottomans trample the Georgian soil.

The illustrious warrior Giorgi Saakadze stands at the head of the people's army and, luring the Turks into a mountain gorge, decides the outcome of the Suram battle.

Taking advantage of the current whereabouts of King Luarsab II of Kartli, Saakadze starts building fortresses on the borders of the state. However, the marriage of the Tsar to Tekle, sister of Giorgi, creates open anger in the circle of princes. Vigilantes of Shadiman, counselor of Laursab, treacherously attack the castle of Saakadze and force him and his family to flee to Persia.

Shah Abbas trusts Saakadze to lead the Persian army. After a series of victorious campaigns, Giorgi Saakadze is proclaimed as the greatest military commander.

By order of the Shah, the army under the command of Giorgi Saakadze invades Georgia. With the help of foreigners, Giorgi intends to pacify the unruly feudal lords and create a single Georgian state under the scepter of Laursab II.

However, the hypocritical Shah deceives Giorgi - he announces the immunity of the princes who agreed to give him the king Laursaba. The Persian army destroys everything in its path, steals Georgians into slavery.

The king is sent to Persia. Giorgi Saakadze is accused of this event.

Having met with the common people, Giorgi swears that he is the faithful son of Georgia. He calls on the people to go into battle against Persia.

The Persian army is broken. Georgia is liberated.

The joy of victory is darkened by the news of Shah having murdered Giorgi's son - Paata.

The enemies are driven out of Georgia, but the fear of the collapse of the feudal foundations unites the strength of the princes. With a sudden attack, the princes break the great Mouravi.

The noble, but premature affair of Georgi Saakadze is defeated.

Cast 
 Akaki Khorava - Giorgi Saakadze
 Veriko Anjaparidze - Rusudan - His Wife 
 Liana Asatiani - Tekle, his sister, later Queen of Georgia 
 Spartak Bagashvili - Luarsab II - King of Georgia
 Georgiy Daneliya - peasant boy (uncredited)
Medea Japaridze — Tinatin

References

External links 

1942 drama films
1942 films
Kartuli Pilmi films
Films directed by Mikheil Chiaureli
Soviet drama films
Soviet black-and-white films
1940s Russian-language films